Latvia competed at the 2004 Summer Olympics in Athens, Greece, from 13 to 29 August 2004. This was the nation's eighth appearance at the Summer Olympics.

The Latvian Olympic Committee sent the nation's smallest delegation to the Games since the breakup of the Soviet Union. A total of 32 athletes, 22 men and 10 women, competed only in 11 sports. Fourteen athletes had previously competed in Sydney, including silver medalist Aigars Fadejevs in men's race walk, defending Olympic champion Igors Vihrovs in men's floor exercises, and judoka and bronze medalist Vsevolods Zeļonijs. Pistol shooter and former Olympic champion Afanasijs Kuzmins, the oldest of the team, at age 57, became the first Latvian athlete to compete in seven Olympic games (including three of his appearances under the Soviet Union). Meanwhile, javelin thrower and Latvia's top Olympic medal contender Vadims Vasiļevskis was appointed by the committee to become the nation's flag bearer in the opening ceremony.

Latvia left Athens with a total of four Olympic silver medals, surpassing a single short of the overall tally from Sydney. Three of these medals were awarded to the athletes for the first time in men's javelin throw, modern pentathlon, and weightlifting. Gymnast Jevgēņijs Saproņenko claimed another sporting medal for his team with a silver in the men's vault exercises, adding it to a prestigious gold from Igors Vihrovs in Sydney four years earlier.

Medalists

Athletics

Latvian athletes have so far achieved qualifying standards in the following athletics events (up to a maximum of 3 athletes in each event at the 'A' Standard, and 1 at the 'B' Standard).

Key
 Note – Ranks given for track events are within the athlete's heat only
 Q = Qualified for the next round
 q = Qualified for the next round as a fastest loser or, in field events, by position without achieving the qualifying target
 NR = National record
 N/A = Round not applicable for the event
 Bye = Athlete not required to compete in round

Men
Track & road events

Field events

Combined events – Decathlon

Women
Track & road events

Field events

Canoeing

Sprint

Qualification Legend: Q = Qualify to final; q = Qualify to semifinal

Cycling

Road

Gymnastics

Artistic
Men

Judo

Modern pentathlon

Sailing

Latvian sailors have qualified one boat for each of the following events.

Women

Shooting

Men

Swimming

Latvian swimmers earned qualifying standards in the following events (up to a maximum of 2 swimmers in each event at the A-standard time, and 1 at the B-standard time):

Men

Women

Weightlifting

One Latvian weightlifter qualified for the following events:

Wrestling

Latvia has qualified the following quota places.

Key:
  - Victory by Fall.
  - Decision by Points - the loser with technical points.
  - Decision by Points - the loser without technical points.

Men's Greco-Roman

See also
 Latvia at the 2004 Summer Paralympics

References

External links
Official Report of the XXVIII Olympiad
Latvian Olympic Committee 

Nations at the 2004 Summer Olympics
2004
Summer Olympics